The first Vagnorius Cabinet was the 3rd cabinet of Lithuania since the declaration of independence in 1990. It consisted of the Prime Minister and 18 government ministers.

History 

The previous government, headed by Albertas Šimėnas, was dismissed by the Supreme Council of Lithuania only three days into its term, after Šimėnas briefly disappeared during the January events. Gediminas Vagnorius was appointed the Prime Minister by the Supreme Council on 13 January 1991.

The government served for more than a year. This mainly was caused by the change of parliament's majority. Prime Minister Gediminas Vagnorius was a member of the United Sąjūdis parliamentary group, whose members by late 1991 and early 1992 gradually switched to other parliamentary groups (e. g. Seventh/Moderates' parliamentary group). This led government to become minority one and the infighting with so-called the 'New Majority'. Finally Vagnorius resigned on 14 July 1992, which the Supreme Council accepted on 21 July. On the same day, Aleksandras Abišala, who had served as a Minister on the Vagnorius Cabinet, was appointed in his place, heading the Abišala Cabinet.

Vagnorius Cabinet started the reforms necessary to transition into a market economy, including privatization of state assets and collective farms, as well as a currency reform. However, some of the reforms have been criticized as hasty and inefficient and have been blamed for rapid decline in economic activity. In addition, the confrontational style of the Prime Minister led to infighting within the government, as well as with other leaders of the country.

Vagnorius would later return to head another cabinet between 1996 and 1999.

Cabinet
The following ministers served on the first Vagnorius Cabinet.

References 

Cabinet of Lithuania
1991 establishments in Lithuania
1992 disestablishments in Lithuania
Cabinets established in 1991
Cabinets disestablished in 1992